Caviar  is the self-titled debut album by U.S. alternative rock/power pop group Caviar. It was released on August 29, 2000 by Island Records. Having a sound reminiscent of rock bands such as Cheap Trick and T.Rex, the album contains the band's best known song, "Tangerine Speedo", which has been featured in films such as Charlie's Angels and The Cat In The Hat.

Track listing
All tracks by Caviar except where noted

 "Ok Nightmare" – 4:15
 "Goldmine" – 3:36
 "Tangerine Speedo" (Dominguez, Caviar) – 3:39
 "The Good Times Are Over" (Caviar, Pee Wee King, Chilton Price, Redd Stewart) – 3:34
 "I Thought I Was Found" – 4:35
 "Flawed Like a Diamond" – 3:43
 "Going Out Tonight" – 3:59
 "Sugarless" (Brown, Caviar) – 3:07
 "Automatic Yawns" – 3:12
 "Looked So Hard I Nearly Wrecked My Eyes" – 3:27
 "I Am the Monument" – 4:59

Personnel 
 Engineer, Co-Producer – Andy Gerber (tracks 1, 2, 5 to 11)
 Producer/Recorded by − Johnny K
 Vocals, Lyrics, Guitar − Blake Smith
 Guitar − Dave Suh
 Bass Guitar − Mike Willison
 Drums − Jason Batchko
 Performer – Bucaneros
 Main Performer – Caviar
 Photography – James Smolka
 Performer – Jo Stafford
 Keyboards – John San Juan
 Mixing Assistant – Mark Niemec
 Mixing Assistant – Mark Ralston
 Mixing – Paul David Hager
 Assistant – Tadpole
 Mastering – Ted Jensen
 Performer – The Left Blanke

References

Caviar (band) albums
2000 debut albums
Island Records albums
Albums produced by Johnny K